This article describes a service that has been replaced. The information is retained here for archival and continuity reasons. For the current (as of 2016) service, see OneMK.

MKWeb was the portal operated by Iliffe News and Media partially on behalf of Milton Keynes Council and accordingly described itself as the official website for Milton Keynes and North Bucks. The site was run under varying management since 2002.  By the end of 2007 it claimed to be delivering over 6 million pages. In June 2006, MKWeb was awarded the contract to deliver MK Council's web services for the following 5 years with an option for the Council to extend this for a further 3 years. The agreement was that MKWeb would develop and support two websites, www.milton-keynes.gov.uk and www.mkweb.co.uk, and present them as a single city portal.

MKWeb supported over 40 community and voluntary organisations by providing and maintaining their websites free of charge. One example is the [Citizens Advice Bureau] who have won awards for their website and Speakeasy a local writers group that claimed to attract visitors from all over the world.

Change of operator
In 2007, MKWeb’s parent company, Apollo Digital Developments Ltd, was bought by the Iliffe News and Media group.

Awards
Each year the Society of IT Managers (SOCITM) produce their “Better Connected Report” on behalf of the government. This report provides an insight into the popularity and quality of information provided by city websites associated with local councils. Since 2004 MKWeb has been ranked as one of the top 10 sites in the UK, and 5th most visited city website when weighted by population.

(April 2005) In the 7th Annual survey of local government websites MKWeb was ranked 9th out of 528 official city information websites. When weighted by population the portal came in 5th position.

In October 2008, MKWeb was awarded the “UK’s Community Website of the Year”.

Milton Keynes